The High National Council was the collective head of state of the Kingdom of Hungary from 1945 until 1946.

Members of the First High National Council (January 26, 1945–December 7, 1945)
Parties

Members of the Second High National Council (December 7, 1945–February 1, 1946)
Parties

See also
List of heads of state of Hungary

Sources
World Statesmen - Hungary

Politics of Hungary